Sali may refer to:

Places
 Sali, Algeria, a town and commune in Reggane District, Adrar Province, south-central Algeria
 Sali, Croatia, a village and a municipality in Zadar County, Croatia
 Sali, Ethiopia, a town in Lay Gayint in the Amhara Region of Ethiopia
 Shali, East Azerbaijan, also Sali, a village in Heris County, East Azerbaijan Province, Iran
 Sali-ye Bozorg, also known as Sālī, a village in Khorramabad County, Lorestan Province, Iran
 Sali-ye Kuchek, also known as Salī, a village in Khorramabad County, Lorestan Province, Iran
 Saly, also known as Sali, a seaside resort area in Thiès Region on the Petite Côte of Senegal

Rivers
 Salí River, Argentina
 Sali River (West Bengal)

People

People with the given name
 Sali Noyan (13th-century), Mongol general
 Sali Berisha (born 1944), former president and prime minister of Albania
 Sali Herman (1898-1993), Swiss-born Australian artist
 Sali Kelmendi (1947–2015), Albanian politician
 Sali Subam (born 1955), Papua New Guinean politician
 Sali Turan (born 1949), Turkish painter

People with the surname
 Baba Sali (Rabbi Israel Abuhatzeira; 1890-1984), Moroccan rabbi
 Bill Sali (born 1954), American politician
 Hamsiraji Marusi Sali (died 2004), Filipino terrorist
 Jainal Antel Sali Jr. (1964-2007), Filipino terrorist
 Safee Sali (born 1984), Malaysian footballer
 Negiat Sali (born 1953), Romanian economist
 Ziynet Sali (born 1975), Turkish Cypriot singer

Other uses
 Sali (weapon), a traditional Fijian war club

See also
 Salii, the "leaping priests" of Ancient Rome
 Salli (disambiguation)
 Sally (disambiguation)
 Shali (disambiguation)